Voľné miesto v srdci is the sixth solo album by Marika Gombitová released on OPUS in 1986.

Track listing

Official releases
 1986: Voľné miesto v srdci, LP, MC, OPUS, #9113 1731
 1996: Voľné miesto v srdci, CD, re-release, OPUS, #91 2492
 2004: Voľné miesto v srdci: Komplet 6, 2 bonus tracks, CD, OPUS, #91 1731

Credits and personnel

 Marika Gombitová - lead vocal, writer
 Václav Patejdl - lead vocal, writer, Roland Jupiter 6, SCI Pro-One, Roland MC 202, Linn Drum
 Gabo Dušík - writer, Roland Juno 60, Yamaha DX 7, Yamaha PF 15, piano
 Ján Szabo - bass
 Štefan Hegedüš - writer, electric and acoustic guitar

 Juraj Varsanyi - Simmons drumm
 Marián Jaslovský - tenor saxophone
 Ivan Jombík - programming, Yamaha drum computer RX 11, sound director
 Ján Lauko - producer
 Peter Smolinský - producer
 Štefan Danko - responsible editor

Accolades

Nový čas
In 2007, Voľné miesto v srdci was ranked 66th on the list of the 100 Greatest Slovak Albums of All Time by Nový čas.

POPulár
POPulár was a Slovak music magazine that mapped the domestic and international music scene, maintaining also POP awards. The magazine was published monthly since 1970, until its termination in 1992 (Note: In July 2008, the magazine was restored by Nový Populár, issued twice a month). Gombitová won four times as the Best Female Singer (1983, 1986, 1987-8), and once she received the Best Album award (1987).

References

General

Specific

External links 
 

1986 albums
Marika Gombitová albums